Outlaws of the Desert is a 1941 American Western film directed by Howard Bretherton and written by J. Benton Cheney and Bernard McConville. The film stars William Boyd, Andy Clyde, Brad King, Duncan Renaldo, Luli Deste, Jean Phillips, Forrest Stanley and Nina Guilbert. The film was released on November 1, 1941, by Paramount Pictures.

Plot

Hopalong Cassidy (William Boyd) and his friends Johnny Nelson (Brad King) and California Carlson (Andy Clyde), have been requested by the US government to purchase a herd of Arabian horses in Arabia.

Cast 
 William Boyd as Hopalong Cassidy
 Andy Clyde as California Carlson
 Brad King as Johnny Nelson
 Duncan Renaldo as Sheik Suleiman
 Jean Phillips as Susan Grant
 Forrest Stanley as Charles Grant
 Nina Guilbert as Mrs. Jane Grant
 Luli Deste as Marie Karitza
 Alberto Morin as Nicki Karitza 
 George J. Lewis as Yussuf
 Jean Del Val as Faran El Kader
 Jamiel Hasson as Ali
 Mickey Eissa as Salim

References

External links 
 
 
 
 

1941 films
American black-and-white films
Paramount Pictures films
American Western (genre) films
1941 Western (genre) films
Films directed by Howard Bretherton
Hopalong Cassidy films
1940s English-language films
1940s American films